Wildash is a rural locality in the Southern Downs Region, Queensland, Australia.

History 
The locality's name was derived from the parish name, which in turn was named after pastoralist Frederick John Cobb Wildash of Canning Downs.

Lord John Swamp Provisional School opened on 1878 and closed circa 1882. On 14 October 1883, it reopened as Lord John Swamp State School. In 1924, it was renamed Wildash State School. It closed in 1938.

References

Further reading

External links 
 

Southern Downs Region
Localities in Queensland